Nand Kishore Singh is an Indian politician, economist and former Indian Administrative Service officer. He is a senior member of the Bharatiya Janata Party (BJP) since March 2014 after having served as a Member of Parliament in the Rajya Sabha (2008-2014) from Bihar for the Janata Dal (United).
He has been a senior bureaucrat, Member of the Planning Commission and handled assignments of Union Expenditure and Revenue Secretary. He was also Officer on Special Duty to Prime Minister Atal Bihari Vajpayee.

On 27 November 2017, Modi government appointed him as the chairman of Fifteenth Finance Commission of India.

He is currently on the board of Hindustan Times, ICRIER, IMI, Nalanda University as well as connected with the Stanford University and the India Advisory Committee of London School of Economics and Columbia University. He is the former chairman, board of governors of Management Development Institute (MDI), Gurgaon. He is currently the chairman of the review committee set up under Fiscal Responsibility and Budget Management Act, 2003, under the purview of Ministry of Finance, Government of India.

He is believed to be one of the people involved in the IC-814 response of the Indian government.

Early life and Career

Born in Kolkata on 27 January 1941, Singh did his schooling at St. Xavier's High School, Patna and completed his Senior Cambridge Examination at St. Xavier's College, Patna before he joined St Stephens College, Delhi for pursuing graduation. He did Masters in Economics from the Delhi School of Economics.

Following that, he has held the following positions:
 Member, State Secretariat, Finance Department (1968–69) 
 Under Secretary, Ministry of Commerce (1969–73)
 Special Assistant to Commerce Minister (1973–77)
 Represented India at GATT, UNACTD, UN and the Common Wealth Secretariat. 
 Chairman, Bihar State Electricity Board
 Special Assistant to the former President Pranab Mukherjee, then former Minister of Commerce, Steel and Mines (1980–81)
 First Minister, Economic and Commercial, Indian Embassy, Japan (1981–85)
 Additional Finance Commissioner, Principal Secretary Industries and Industrial Development Commissioner, Bihar (1986–90)
 Joint Secretary Police (Ministry of Home Affairs) (1990–91)
 Joint Secretary, Department of Economic Affairs (Ministry of Finance) (1991–93)
 First Chairman UNGEF (United Nations Global Environment Facility) (1993–94)
 Secretary, Department of Economic Affairs (1993–95)
 Secretary, Department of Expenditure (1995–96)
 Revenue Secretary (1996–98)
 Secretary to former PM AB Vajpayee (1998-2001)
 Member Planning Commission (2001–06)
 Deputy Chairman, Bihar State Planning Board (2006–08)
 Member of Parliament to the Rajya Sabha (2008–14)
President of Institute of Economic Growth (IEG) Society (since 2021)

Tax Reforms
As Revenue Secretary (July 1996 – August 1998), he oversaw the Dream Budget (1997–98), one of the most ambitious tax reforms so far. Tax rates were substantially reduced and personal Income Tax rates were brought down considerably from 15, 30 and 40 per cent to 10, 20 and 30 per cent. Similarly, corporate tax rates were also significantly reduced apart from simplifying and merging the widely varying customs and excise duty structure. Import tariffs were also slashed down to align India's import duties with other emerging markets. 
Moreover, a Voluntary Disclosure of Income Scheme (VDIS) was launched in the same year which enabled people to make voluntary disclosures given the benefits of lower tax rates. This enabled not only tax realisation of over $2 billion as hidden wealth of over Rs.33,000 crores or $10 billion being brought back to the economic stream. The VDIS scheme is considered a watershed and many have clamoured for its repetition both for domestic and foreign income.

Task Force on Telecom
He has also served as the Secretary, Task Force on Telecommunications and played a key role in placing a far-reaching reform on deregulation of India's Telecommunication sector. During his tenure, another major reform in the telecomm policy was to auction the spectrum bandwidth to the highest bidder.

National Highway Development Project
As PMO Secretary and Member Secretary of the Task Force on Infrastructure, N.K. Singh was instrumental in the planning of the 13000 km National Highways Development Project (NHDP). Comprising the Golden Quadrilateral and the North-South and East-West corridors, it was one of the flagship scheme of the Indian Government and NHAI (National Highway Authority of India).

Career as a Member of Parliament
Singh was elected as a Member of Parliament to the Rajya Sabha from Bihar in April 2008 representing the Janata Dal (United). He was a member of several important Parliamentary Committees including the Public Accounts Committee, Committee on Public Undertakings, Committee on External Affairs, Committee on MPLADS, Parliamentary Standing Committee on Human Resource Development, Consultative Committee on Finance and the Parliamentary Forum on Global Warming and Climate Change.
He joined the BJP in the run-up to the General Elections in 2014 following his close association with the NDA for over a decade.

Author 

N.K. Singh has authored The New Bihar which is a collection of essays on the state's model of development, shedding light on its achievements, shortcomings, and the challenges ahead. His other publication, "Not by Reason Alone", is a commentary on Indian political economy, analysing the various reforms pertaining to infrastructure, finance, government policies and Centre-state relations. His first book, "The Politics of Change", gives the reader a window into Indian politics and economy, providing insights into the realities of coalition politics and international fault lines.

Awards

Order of the Rising Sun 

The Japanese order is the second highest civilian award accorded to people with distinguished achievements in the field of international relations, promotion of Japanese culture, development in welfare or preservation of the environment.

On 29 April 2016, NK Singh was conferred with the 2nd class Gold and Silver of the Order of the Rising sun by the Japanese Government. He is the only Indian in the list of recipients of 2016 Spring Imperial Decorations.

Chairman, FRBM Committee 

The Government of India formed a Review Committee to evaluate the FRBM Act, 2003 in order to assess its functionality in the last 12 years. The five-member panel, which includes Former Finance Secretary Sumit Bose, Chief Economic Adviser Arvind Subramanian, Reserve Bank of India Governor Urjit Patel and National Institute of Public Finance and Policy Director Rathin Roy, is chaired by Mr. N.K. Singh. The committee's mandate includes making recommendations to pave the way forward, keeping at its focus fiscal consolidation and prudence. The feasibility of fiscal deficit range and aligning fiscal change with credit change analysis is also incorporated in the ambit.

Nira Radia Tapes 

In the recorded conversations in the Nira Radia tapes, NK Singh is heard stating that he got the order of the speakers in the Rajya Sabha changed to give an edge on retroactive tax rebates to Reliance Industries. N.K. Singh said his Reliance advocacy was for national ‘energy security'.

Notes

References

External links 
 Mr. N. K. Singh
 N K Singh-India's supercrat:Prabhu Chawla
 A K Rai takes over N K Singh as the new Chairman of MDI Gurgaon

1941 births
Living people
20th-century Indian economists
Scientists from Bihar
Indian male writers
Bihar cadre civil servants
Scientists from Patna
Delhi School of Economics alumni
Academic staff of Delhi University
St. Xavier's Patna alumni
Rajya Sabha members from Bihar
Samata Party politicians
Janata Dal (United) politicians
Bharatiya Janata Party politicians from Bihar
Politicians from Patna
Indian Administrative Service officers